Narenjbon or Narenj Bon may refer to:
 Narenj Bon, Gilan
 Narenjbon-e Bala, Gilan Province
 Narenjbon-e Pain, Gilan Province
 Narenjbon, Mazandaran